"Viva Las Vegas" is a 1964 song recorded by Elvis Presley written by Doc Pomus and Mort Shuman for his film Viva Las Vegas, which along with the song was set for general release the year after. Although Elvis Presley sang the song live only twice, it has since become widely known and often performed by others. The RIAA certified the single disc "Viva Las Vegas/What I Said" gold on March 27, 1992, having sold 500,000 copies in the United States.

History
The song was recorded on July 10, 1963. Released as a single in 1964 with the B-side "What'd I Say" from the same film, "Viva Las Vegas" charted separately from its B-side, reaching No. 29 on the Billboard Hot 100 pop singles chart. The Elvis version of "What'd I Say" peaked at No. 21, the two sides having equivalent appeal in the marketplace. "Viva Las Vegas" reached No. 17 on the UK Singles Chart, improving to No. 15 after a reissue in 2007. The single reached No. 20 on the Record World chart in the U.S. and No. 14 in Canada.

The song was published by Elvis Presley Music, Inc.

In the years since its first release, the song has become one of Presley's most recognized numbers. In the 1990s and 2000s, the song appeared in countless movies and TV sitcoms, either as a reference to the city of Las Vegas, or simply as an expression of joy or bewilderment in related comedic situations.

In 2002, the city of Las Vegas requested Elvis Presley Enterprises, the company that handles a portion of Elvis's legacy and all Elvis-related music rights, to allow it to be the official song of the city. Negotiations stalled over the price requested by EPE, notwithstanding that EPE had not controlled the copyright to the song since 1993, at which time it became the property of the families of the songwriters Doc Pomus and Mort Shuman. Since EPE no longer owns the copyright to the song, it essentially means that EPE does not have the authority or right to negotiate the use of the song "Viva Las Vegas" within the United States, its territories and possessions, although EPE may be able to negotiate the use of the actual Elvis recording of the song.

Use in other media
 The song is featured on the main tracklist of the 2010 video game Just Dance 2.
 The song has been adopted as the victory theme for the National Hockey League (NHL)'s Vegas Golden Knights when they win games at T-Mobile Arena.

ZZ Top version

ZZ Top recorded a version of "Viva Las Vegas" as one of two new tracks on their Greatest Hits album (1992). "Viva Las Vegas" was released as a single and reached the Top 10 in both the UK (No. 10) and Ireland (No. 8). This version appeared in a 1993 episode of Beavis and Butt-head. They used some sound elements from Michael Jackson's "Jam" in the track.

Charts

Elvis Presley's original version

ZZ Top cover

References

External links
 
 

1964 singles
1992 singles
Elvis Presley songs
Dead Kennedys songs
ZZ Top songs
Bruce Springsteen songs
Songs with music by Mort Shuman
Songs with lyrics by Doc Pomus
Songs about Las Vegas
RCA Records singles
1963 songs
Vegas Golden Knights